Pachydactylus vansoni, commonly known as Van Son's gecko or Van Son's thick-toed gecko, is a species of lizard in the family Gekkonidae. The species is endemic to Southern Africa.

Etymology
The specific name, vansoni, is in honor of Russian-born Dutch entomologist Georges Van Son (1898-1967), who worked at the Transvaal Museum (1925-1967).

Geographic range
P. vansoni is distributed in Lesotho, Mozambique, South Africa, Eswatini, and Zimbabwe.  The geographic range of this species is estimated to be larger than 100,000 km2 (38,610 sq mi).

Habitat

Reproduction
P. vansoni is oviparous.

References

Further reading
Barts M, Colacicco F (2015). "Die Dickfingergeckos des südlichen Afrikas. Tiel XVII: Pachydactylus vansoni FITZSIMONS, 1933 ". Sauria 37 (1): 41–48. (in German).
Branch, Bill (2004). Field Guide to Snakes and other Reptiles of Southern Africa. Third Revised edition, Second impression. Sanibel Island, Florida: Ralph Curtis Books. 399 pp. . (Pachydactylus vansoni, pp. 262–263 + Plate 83).
FitzSimons VFM (1933). "Descriptions of Five New Lizards from the Transvaal and Southern Rhodesia". Annals of the Transvaal Museum 15 (2): 273–280. (Pachydactylus capensis vansoni, new subspecies).
Girard F (2013). "Pachydactylus vansoni FitzSimons, 1933, Van Son's Thick-toed Gecko. Captive Breeding". African Herp News (60): 19–20.
Rösler H (1993). "Contributions to the knowledge of African geckos (Reptilia: Sauria: Gekkonidae). 1. Records of a five year period of maintenance and reproduction of Pachydactylus vansoni FitzSimons 1933". Journal of the Herpetological Association of Africa 42 (1): 13–19.
Rösler H (2000). "Kommentierte Liste der rezent, subrezent und fossil bekannten Geckotaxa (Reptilia: Gekkonomorpha)". Gekkota 2: 28–153. (Pachydactylus vansoni, p. 99). (in German).

External links
Photographs at Biodiversityexplorer.org

vansoni
Geckos of Africa
Reptiles of Mozambique
Reptiles of South Africa
Reptiles of Eswatini
Reptiles of Zimbabwe
Reptiles described in 1933
Taxa named by Vivian Frederick Maynard FitzSimons